Common names: Mexican palm-pitviper.

Bothriechis rowleyi is a species of pit viper, a venomous snake, in the subfamily Crotalinae of the family Viperidae. The species is endemic to Mexico. There are no subspecies that are recognized as being valid.

Etymology
The specific name, rowleyi, is in honor of American ornithologist John Stuart Rowley, who was one of the collectors of the holotype.

Description
B. rowleyi is slender and green with a prehensile tail. Adults grow to a total length (including tail) of at least

Geographic range
B. rowleyi is found in Mexico in southeastern Oaxaca and northern Chiapas. It occurs in cloud forests at  altitude. The type locality given is "a ridge that extends northward from Rancho Vicente, Colonia Rodolfo Figueroa, approximately 5 miles west of Cerro Baúl.

Conservation status
The species B. rowleyi is classified as Vulnerable (VU) on the IUCN Red List of Threatened Species with the following criteria: B1ab(iii)+2ab(iii) (v3.1, 2001). It is therefore considered to be facing a high risk of extinction in the wild.

References

Further reading
Bogert CM (1968). "A New Arboreal Pit Viper of the Genus Bothrops from the Isthmus of Tehuantepec, Mexico". American Museum Novitates (2341): 1-14. (Bothrops rowleyi, new species).
Heimes P (2016). Snakes of Mexico: Herpetofauna Mexicana Vol. I. Frankfurt, Germany: Chimaira. 572 pp. .
Johnson JD, Mata-Silva V, García-Padilla E, Wilson LD (2015). "The Herpetofauna of Chiapas, Mexico: composition, distribution, and conservation". Mesoamerican Herpetology 2 (3): 272–329.
Mata-Silva V, Johnson JD, Wilson LD, García-Padilla E (2015). "The herpetofauna of Oaxaca, Mexico: composition, physiographic distribution, and conservation status". Mesoamerican Herpetology 2 (1): 6-62.
Wallach V, Williams KL, Boundy J (2014). Snakes of the World: A Catalogue of Living and Extinct Species. Boca Raton, Florida: CRC Press, Taylor & Francis Group. 1,237 pp. . (Bothriechis rowleyi, p. 108).

External links

Reptiles described in 1968
rowleyi
Endemic reptiles of Mexico
Taxa named by Charles Mitchill Bogert